The  Tampa Bay Storm season was the eighth season for the Arena Football League franchise. They finished 7–5 in the National Conference. The Storm lost in the AFL's Semi-finals to Orlando.

Regular season

Schedule

Standings

z – clinched homefield advantage

y – clinched division title

x – clinched playoff spot

Playoffs

References

External links
1994 Tampa Bay Storm season at arenafan.com

1994 Arena Football League season
Tampa Bay Storm seasons
1994 in sports in Florida
20th century in Tampa, Florida